John Robert Navarre (born September 9, 1980) is a former American football quarterback who was a three-year starter for the Michigan Wolverines from 2001 to 2003, leading the Wolverines to the 2003 Big Ten Conference championship in his final year of eligibility. He was drafted by the Arizona Cardinals in the 2004 NFL Draft and played for the Cardinals in 2004 and 2005.

Early years
Navarre was born in Cudahy, Wisconsin, a Milwaukee suburb, in 1980. He attended Cudahy High School where he had a record of 33–4 as the starting quarterback for the football team. Head coach for Cudahy was Carey Venne.

College career
Navarre enrolled at the University of Michigan in 1999 and played college football for head coach Lloyd Carr's Michigan Wolverines football teams from 2000 to 2003. With Tom Brady and Drew Henson as the two leading quarterbacks in 1999, Navarre redshirted. On that year's roster, Navarre was listed at 6'6" and weighed 220 pounds.

2000
To begin the 2000 season, Henson sustained an injury in practice that required redshirt-freshman Navarre to start under center against Michigan's first opponent, Bowling Green. In his first career start, Navarre threw for four touchdowns, a school record for a first-time starting quarterback and the most ever in a season opener. The four touchdown passes also tied a school record at the time. Navarre's play in the opener earned him Big Ten Conference Offensive Player of the Week. Navarre continued his role as starting quarterback as Henson continued to be sidelined by injury, getting his second start against Rice. Michigan went on the road against #14 UCLA and lost, 23–20. The following week, Michigan began Big Ten play against #19 Illinois. While Navarre started his fourth game in a row, Henson replaced him late in the first half.  Navarre saw limited action at quarterback the rest of the season, ending the season with 583 passing yards and 8 touchdowns in 10 games.

Shortly after Michigan's win against Auburn in the 2001 Citrus Bowl, Henson announced he would come back for his senior season and forgo entering the 2001 NFL Draft. In 1998, Henson was drafted by the Major League Baseball's New York Yankees in the amateur draft and although he had already told Michigan he was returning for his senior season, he left to begin his pursuit of a Major League career.

2001
Navarre began the 2001 season as Michigan's starting quarterback, a role he kept until his last year of eligibility in 2003. In his first full season as Michigan's starting quarterback, Navarre threw for 2,345 yards and 19 touchdowns. Michigan ended the regular season 8–3 before going on to lose their Citrus Bowl match-up with Tennessee, snapping the school's four-game bowl win streak. In the loss, Navarre threw for 240 yards and two touchdowns.

2002
In his junior season, Navarre led Michigan to a 9–3 regular season record before a showcase performance in the Outback Bowl, where he threw for a career-high 319 yards and one touchdown en route to 38–30 win over Florida and a 10–3 record to end the season.

2003
On October 4, 2003, at Kinnick Stadium, he established the school single-game record for most passing yards: 389 vs. Iowa. The record stood until Devin Gardner totaled 503 yards on October 19, 2013 against Indiana. In his senior campaign, Navarre again led Michigan to a 10–3 overall record, and the team's first Rose Bowl appearance since the 1997 season. During the regular season, Navarre amassed 3,331 passing yards and 24 touchdowns, posting wins over Michigan rivals, Notre Dame, 38–0, and Ohio State, 35-21. The Wolverines finished the season against USC, ranked #1 in both polls, in the Rose Bowl. In the 28–14 loss, Navarre had played his last game as a quarterback at Michigan, gaining 271 passing yards and one touchdown on 27 completions in 46 attempts.

Michigan records
Navarre holds the following Michigan football records:
 Most pass attempts in a season: 456 (2003)
 Most pass completions in a season: 270 (2003)
 Most passing yards in a season: 3,331 (2003)
 Most touchdown passes in a game: 4 (tied for second, broken by Jake Ruddock with 6 TDs in 2015), three occasions (2000, vs. Bowling Green; 2002, vs. Western Michigan and vs. Illinois)
 Most total offensive plays in a season: 504 (2003)

Navarre held several Michigan career passing records including those for attempts, completions, and passing yards before Chad Henne surpassed those marks in 2007. He also held the records for most total offensive yards gained in a game (368 vs. Iowa in 2003) and in a season (3,240 in 2003) before being surpassed by Denard Robinson in 2010. In 2003, Navarre led the Wolverines to their largest comeback in school history, overcoming a 21-point deficit as they defeated Minnesota, 38–35.

Professional career

Navarre was drafted in the seventh round of the 2004 NFL Draft by the Arizona Cardinals and served as their third-string quarterback for the 2004 through 2005 seasons. He started one game for the Cardinals in 2004, throwing four interceptions and one touchdown in a losing effort against the Detroit Lions. Navarre appeared in five games in his three-year NFL career; his debut was December 5, 2004.

Personal life
Navarre currently resides in Elmhurst, Illinois. He works as the Operations Manager at Alro Steel Corporation's Bolingbrook, Illinois  plant.

See also
 Lists of Michigan Wolverines football passing leaders

References

External links
 

1980 births
Living people
American football quarterbacks
Arizona Cardinals players
Michigan Wolverines football players
People from Cudahy, Wisconsin
People from Waterford, Wisconsin
Players of American football from Wisconsin
Sportspeople from the Milwaukee metropolitan area